Underwood's pocket gopher (Heterogeomys underwoodi) is a species of rodent in the family Geomyidae. It is endemic to Costa Rica. Some authors classify it in the genus Orthogeomys, but recent research has allowed this and its related species to be classified in the genus Heterogeomys.

References

Underwood's pocket
Underwood's pocket
Rodents of Central America
Mammals described in 1931
Least concern biota of North America
Taxonomy articles created by Polbot